The Horticultural Center in Philadelphia, USA, contains an arboretum, greenhouse, demonstration gardens and a Japanese house and garden. It is located within Fairmount Park at the southeast corner of Belmont and Montgomery Drives. The grounds are open daily except holidays, without charge. An admission fee is charged for the Japanese house.

The Horticulture Center was built for the 1976 United States Bicentennial celebration, on the site of Philadelphia's earlier Horticultural Hall, built in 1876 for the Centennial Exposition. Its grounds contain:

 The  Centennial Arboretum
 An exhibition hall
 A  greenhouse with tropical plants
 Seven demonstration gardens
 Shofuso Japanese House and Gardens, with the house built in the 16th century shoin-zukuri style.
 Centennial comfort stations

See also 
 List of botanical gardens in the United States

External links 
Fairmount Park Horticulture Center - City of Philadelphia Parks & Recreation

Botanical gardens in Pennsylvania
Greenhouses in Pennsylvania
Parks in Philadelphia
Japanese-American culture in Pennsylvania
West Fairmount Park
West Philadelphia